Chinese lake gudgeon (Sarcocheilichthys sinensis) is a species of cyprinid fish found in various freshwater habitats with little current from the Amur basin to Korea and China.

References

Sarcocheilichthys
Taxa named by Pieter Bleeker
Fish described in 1871